ParaMind Brainstorming Software is one of many brainstorming software programs and was the first of the generative programs that went beyond random word combination.

ParaMind was mentioned in the book, "The Age of Spiritual Machines", by Ray Kurzweil. ParaMind was also noted in Creative Problem Solving for Managers: Developing Skills for Decision Making And Innovation, by Tony Proctor, Ideate with June A Valladares by June A. Valladares and Root Cause Analysis: Simplified Tools and Techniques, Second Edition by Bjorn Andersen and Tom Fagerhaug.

In Guide to Writing Empirical Papers, Theses, and Dissertations author G. David Garson states, 

The Exhaustion of the Interaction of Words: Brainstorming with the ParaMind Brainstorming Program, by R.S. Pearson is devoted to ParaMind. It discusses an experimental linguistic theory that has philosophical overtones.

 The company released a more advanced Professional Version in 2002. The company produced databases for Science and Law/Business that
can be added to any version after 3.0. 64-bit versions are available for Windows 7 and Windows 8, as well as current Macintosh and Linux operating systems.

Sources
 Proctor, Tony: Creative Problem Solving for Managers: Developing Skills for Decision Making And Innovation, Routledge. Exeter 2005. 
 Pearson, R.S.: The Exhaustion of the Interaction of Words: Brainstorming with the ParaMind Brainstorming Program, Telical Books. Seattle 2007. 
 Valladares, June A.: Ideate with June A Valladares, Sage Publications. Stamford 2005. 
 Andersen, Bjorn: Root Cause Analysis: Simplified Tools and Techniques, ASQ Quality Press. Milwaukee 2006.

In music 
 Bon Iver, 29 #Strafford APTS (on album 22, A Million)

References 

Collaborative software
Windows software
Software companies based in Washington (state)
Software companies of the United States